Stenosphenus beyeri is a species of beetle in the family Cerambycidae. It was described by Schaeffer in 1905.

References

Elaphidiini
Beetles described in 1905